Benjamin B. Cunningham (1874 in Rochester, New York – January 2, 1946), graduated from the Rochester Free Academy in 1892, studied law in the office of William Butler Crittenden, and was admitted to the bar in 1895.

From 1898 to 1916 he was employed by the Corporation Counsel of Rochester, holding the posts of Managing Clerk, Assistant City Attorney, and City attorney in succession.  He was elected Corporation Counsel in 1915, holding office from 1916 to the close of 1919, during which period he put in a year as President of the Rochester Bar Association.  In his capacity as Corporation Counsel, he was the draftsman of a new City Charter, engaged in lengthy litigation to protect the City's water supply in Hemlock, and had repeated confrontations in court with local monopolies and the State Public Service Commission over fares and practices.

Cunningham was twice elected to the Supreme Court for the Seventh District, sitting from 1920 to his mandatory retirement at the close of 1944.  He also stood as a Republican candidate for the State Court of Appeals in 1940, a failing enterprise.  He functioned as a trial judge for seventeen years before being appointed to the Appellate Division for the Fourth Department in 1937.  He was elevated to Presiding Justice in 1944, a post he held for the entirety of that year.

He acted as an Official Referee from his retirement to his death on January 2, 1946.

American lawyers
1946 deaths
1874 births